Mark Bunn may refer to:
Mark Bunn (Australian footballer) (born 1970), Australian rules footballer
Mark Bunn (English footballer) (born 1984), English goalkeeper